The 1989–90 Aston Villa season saw the football club competing in the Football League First Division. A lowly 17th the previous season, Villa improved drastically and spent most of the season challenging for the title though finishing in second behind Liverpool. This was Villa's highest finish since 1980–81, and a great result for a team in the second season of the top flight. At the end of the season Jozef Vengloš became the first manager from outside of Britain of a top flight club in English football history.

Key players in the team this season were high-scoring midfielder David Platt, who broke into the England team and went on to play at the World Cup, as well as being voted PFA Player of the Year, and new defender Paul McGrath, a £450,000 pre-season signing from Manchester United. Aston Villa played in kit manufactured by Danish company Hummel and sponsored by Mita Copiers.

Slovak Jozef Vengloš, who had just led Czechoslovakia to the quarter-finals of the World Cup, replaced Graham Taylor who had accepted an offer to take over management of the England national football team. During Taylor's tenure the club failed to report to police sexual abuse by scout, Ted Langford.

Squad
Squad at end of season

Left club during season

Youth and reserves

Trainees

Apprentices

Other players

Trialists

Transfers

In
  Paul McGrath –  Manchester United, 3 August 1989, £400,000
  Dwight Yorke

Out
  Allan Evans –  Leicester City
  Alan McInally –  Bayern Munich, £1,200,000
  Mark Lillis –  Scunthorpe United, 21 September, £40,000
  Adrian Heath –  Manchester City, February 1990, £300,000

Results

First Division

 Nottingham Forest 1–1 Aston Villa 
 Aston Villa 1–1 Liverpool 
 Aston Villa 1–1 Charlton Athletic 
 Southampton 2–1 Aston Villa 
 Aston Villa 2–0 Tottenham Hotspur
 Sheffield Wednesday 1–0 Aston Villa 
 Aston Villa 1–3 QPR 
 Aston Villa 1–0 Derby County 
 Luton Town 0–1 Aston Villa 
 Manchester City 0–2 Aston Villa 
 Aston Villa 2–1 Crystal Palace 
 Aston Villa 6–2 Everton
 Norwich City 2–0 Aston Villa 
 Aston Villa 4–1 Coventry City 
 Wimbledon 0–2 Aston Villa 
 Aston Villa 2–1 Nottingham Forest 
 Liverpool 1–1 Aston Villa
 Millwall 2–0 Aston Villa
 Aston Villa 3–0 Manchester United
 Aston Villa 2–1 Arsenal 
 Chelsea 0–3 Aston Villa 
 Charlton Athletic 0–2 Aston Villa 
 Aston Villa 2–1 Southampton 
 Aston Villa 1–0 Sheffield Wednesday 
 Tottenham Hotspur 0–2 Aston Villa
 Aston Villa 0–3 Wimbledon
 Coventry City 2–0 Aston Villa 
 Aston Villa 2–0 Luton Town 
 QPR 1–1 Aston Villa 
 Derby County 0–1 Aston Villa 
 Crystal Palace 1–0 Aston Villa 
 Aston Villa 1–2 Manchester City
 Arsenal 0–1 Aston Villa 
 Aston Villa 1–0 Chelsea
 Manchester United 2–0 Aston Villa 
 Aston Villa 1–0 Millwall
 Aston Villa 3–3 Norwich 
 Everton 3–3 Aston Villa

FA Cup

League Cup

Notes

References

Aston Villa F.C. seasons
Aston Villa